North Branch Verdigre Creek is a  long second-order tributary to Verdigre Creek in Knox County, Nebraska.

Course
North Branch Verdigre Creek rises on the Elkhorn River divide about 4 miles southeast of Opportunity, Nebraska in Holt County and then flows northeast into Knox County and then east-southeast to join Verdigre Creek about 1 mile southwest of Verdigre, Nebraska.

Watershed
North Branch Verdigre Creek drains  of area, receives about 25.3 in/year of precipitation, has a wetness index of 603.97, and is about 4.23% forested.

See also

List of rivers of Nebraska

References

Rivers of Holt County, Nebraska
Rivers of Knox County, Nebraska
Rivers of Nebraska